Francesca Gambacorta Magliani was an Italian painter, born on July 8, 1845, in Palermo, Sicily.

Biography

Magliani studied under private tutors in Palermo, then moved to Florence to study under professors Beducci and Michele Gordigiani. She made reproductions of antique masters. Among her works are: Portrait of her mother, Modesty and Vanity, Portrait of Deputy Guido Baccelli, the minister of public education, and Portrait of Agostino Magliani, her husband, who was minister of finance. She was noted for her portraiture, and for her use of pastels. To the Exposition Beatrice in Florence, she sent a life-size portraits of King and Queen Umberto and Margherita.

References

1845 births
19th-century Italian painters
Painters from Palermo
Italian women painters
Year of death missing
19th-century Italian women artists